El Santo Niño is a small village in Baja California Sur in La Paz Municipality. The village had a population of 24 as of 2010.

References

Populated places in Baja California Sur
La Paz Municipality (Baja California Sur)